Stephan Waser (sometimes shown as Stephen Waser) (March 10, 1920 – June 19, 1992) was a Swiss bobsledder who competed from the late 1940s to the early 1950s. At the 1952 Winter Olympics in Oslo, he won bronze medals in both the two-man and four-man events.

Waser also won four medals at the FIBT World Championships with three golds (Two and Four-man: 1947, Two-man: 1950) and one silver (Four-man: 1950).

References
Bobsleigh two-man Olympic medalists 1932-56 and since 1964
Bobsleigh four-man Olympic medalists for 1924, 1932-56, and since 1964
Bobsleigh two-man world championship medalists since 1931
Bobsleigh four-man world championship medalists since 1930
DatabaseOlympics.com profile

1920 births
1992 deaths
Bobsledders at the 1952 Winter Olympics
Swiss male bobsledders
Olympic medalists in bobsleigh
Medalists at the 1952 Winter Olympics
Olympic bronze medalists for Switzerland
20th-century Swiss people